Jerome Murray Sattler (born March 3, 1931) is an American clinical psychologist who is Professor Emeritus and adjunct professor of psychology at San Diego State University. He is known for his work regarding intelligence testing in children, including his role in developing the fourth edition of the Stanford-Binet Intelligence Scale in 1986, along with R. L. Thorndike and Elizabeth Hagan. He is also the author of the widely used school psychology textbook Assessment of Children. In 2022, he published Foundations of Behavioral, Social, and Clinical Assessment of Children, 7th edition.

Education and academic career
A native of New York City, Sattler earned his B.A. from the City College of New York in 1952. He then enrolled in graduate school at the University of Kansas, where he received his M.A. and Ph.D. in psychology in 1953 and 1959, respectively. He is a clinical psychology diplomate of the American Board of Professional Psychology. He retired from the 
San Diego State University faculty in 1994, after teaching there for 29 years.

Influence
According to a 2002 article in Learning and Individual Differences, "Perhaps no two persons have had as much impact on the practice of intelligence testing in schools in the last 30 years as Jerome Sattler and Alan Kaufman."

Honors and awards
Sattler is a fellow of the American Psychological Association. In 1998, he received the Senior Scientist Award from the American Psychological Association's Division of School Psychology. In 2003, he received an honorary Doctor of Science degree from Central Missouri State University. In 2005, he received the Gold Medal Award for Life Achievement in the Application of Psychology from the American Psychological Foundation. In 2006, he received the San Diego Psychological Association's Distinguished Contribution to Psychology Award. In 2015, he received The 1949 Award from the University of Kansas Clinical Psychology Program in recognition of being a distinguished alumni for his outstanding contributions to clinical psychology. In 2018, he received the Commemorative Medallion—“Semper Discentes et Adservientes” (Always Learning and Serving)—from the College of Psychology, Nova Southeastern University.

References

External links
Faculty page

1931 births
Living people
Educational psychologists
21st-century American psychologists
Intelligence researchers
San Diego State University faculty
Scientists from New York City
City College of New York alumni
University of Kansas alumni
Fellows of the American Psychological Association
20th-century American psychologists